Alpha globulins are a group of globular proteins in plasma that are highly mobile in alkaline or electrically charged solutions. They inhibit certain blood proteases and show significant inhibitor activity.

The alpha globulins typically have molecular weights of around 93 kDa.

Examples
Alpha globulins include certain hormones, proteins that transport hormones, and other compounds, including prothrombin and HDL.

Alpha 1 globulins
α1-antitrypsin
Alpha 1-antichymotrypsin
Orosomucoid (acid glycoprotein)
Serum amyloid A
Alpha 1-lipoprotein

Alpha 2 globulins
Haptoglobin
Alpha-2u globulin
α2-macroglobulin
Ceruloplasmin
Thyroxine-binding globulin
Alpha 2-antiplasmin
Protein C
Alpha 2-lipoprotein
Angiotensinogen
  Cortisol binding globulin
Vitamin D-binding protein

References

Blood proteins